2020 Czech Lion Awards ceremony will be held in March 2021. Awards underwent changes as new Categories were added. Animated film and Web works will be newly Awarded in their respective Categories. Some categories became open for Television and Web works as a result of increase in Television work quality.

Václav Kopta was announced to host ceremony scheduled for 6 March 2021. Nominations were announced on 18 January 2021. Shadow Country was nominated in 15 categories while Charlatan and Havel in 14 categories. Charlatan was awarded the Best film award while Shadow Country received most wins.

Categories
New Categories include Best animated film and Best Short film. Nominations were announced on 18 January 2021.

Non-statutory Awards

References

2020 film awards
Czech Lion Awards ceremonies